The Roman Catholic Diocese of Budjala is a diocese located in the city of Budjala  in the Ecclesiastical province of Mbandaka-Bikoro in the Democratic Republic of the Congo.

History
 November 25, 1964: Established as Diocese of Budjala from the Diocese of Lisala

Bishops
 Bishops of Budjala (Latin Rite), in reverse chronological order
 Bishop Philibert Tembo Nlandu (since 2009.10.22)
 Bishop Joseph Bolangi Egwanga Ediba Tasame (1974.01.24 - 2009)
 Bishop François van den Berghe, C.I.C.M. (1964.11.25 – 1974)

Coadjutor bishop
Philibert Tembo Nlandu, C.I.C.M. (2007-2009)

See also
Roman Catholicism in the Democratic Republic of the Congo

Sources
 GCatholic.org
 Catholic Hierarchy

Roman Catholic dioceses in the Democratic Republic of the Congo
Christian organizations established in 1964
Roman Catholic dioceses and prelatures established in the 20th century
Roman Catholic Ecclesiastical Province of Mbandaka-Bikoro